Halidrys siliquosa is a large marine brown algae.

Description
The fronds are somewhat flattened, tough and leathery. They and less than 1 cm broad. The branches occur alternately arranged in one plane. Air bladders occur and are oblong and pointed. The plants are attached by a discoid holdfast.

Reproduction
The plants are hermaphroditic, bearing bisexual conceptacles  appearing as pods on stalks at the end of branches.

Distribution
Generally found around Ireland, Great Britain - including Shetland and the Isle of Man.

Habitat
Low level, low littoral, rock pools.

References

Fucales